The Shire of Talbot and Clunes was a local government area about  northwest of Melbourne, the state capital of Victoria, Australia.

History

What became the Shire of Talbot and Clunes had its origins in several different local authorities during the 1850s gold rush:

It was renamed as the Borough of Talbot on 19 April 1915, as Talbot by that time had eclipsed Amherst.
 The Amherst and Clunes Road District was incorporated on 16 November 1860, and was redesignated as a shire under the name of Shire of Talbot on 31 October 1865.

After the passage of the Local Government Amendment Act 1914, it was found that Talbot Borough did not meet the criteria for a borough, as its rateable income was below £300 per annum, so it was absorbed by Talbot Shire on 1 October 1915.

On 31 May 1965, an Order in Council united the Borough of Clunes with the Shire of Talbot, to create the new shire of Talbot and Clunes.

On 20 January 1995, the Shire of Talbot and Clunes was abolished, and was split between the newly created Shire of Central Goldfields (Talbot) and the newly created Shire of Hepburn (Clunes).

Wards

Talbot and Clunes was divided into four ridings, each of which elected three councillors:
 Clunes North Riding
 Clunes South Riding
 East Riding
 Talbot Riding

Towns and localities
 Amherst
 Caralulup
 Clunes
 Daisy Hill
 Dunach
 Mount Beckworth
 Red Lion
 Talbot*

* Council seat.

Population

* Estimate in 1958 Victorian Year Book.

References

External links
 Victorian Places - Talbot and Clunes Shire

Talbot and Clunes